Alexander Mellqvist (born 28 January 1986) is a Swedish footballer who plays for Ljungskile SK as a defender.

References

External links

Alexander Mellqvist Profile

1986 births
Living people
Association football midfielders
Swedish footballers
Sweden youth international footballers
Allsvenskan players
Superettan players
Örgryte IS players
Ljungskile SK players
Varbergs BoIS players